Gonzalo Javier Trancho Gayo (Madrid, 8 February 1955) is a Spanish anthropologist.

He obtained doctor and bachelor degrees in Biological Sciences at the Universidad Complutense de Madrid, where he is also a professor in the Zoology and Anthropology Department. His thesis dealt with a cell biology study of populations of Nilotides and he has taken part in several researches in Spain and more countries (for instance, El hombre arcaico costero: su biodiversidad y bioadaptación, Chile). He's a member of the Asociación Española de Paleopatología

Partial bibliography
Paleodieta de la población ibérica de Villasviejas del Tamuja : análisis de la necrópolis de el Mercadillo (Botija, Cáceres), 1998.
Dieta, indicadores de salud y caracterización biomorfológica de la población medieval musulmana de Xarea (Vélez Rubio, Almería), 1998.
Investigaciones antropológicas en España, 1997.

External links
Asociación Española de Paleopatología
Boletín

1955 births
Living people
Spanish anthropologists
Spanish biologists